(born March 28, 1962) is a Japanese businessman, educator, and venture capitalist. He is the founder and president of Globis Corporation and Globis University Graduate School of Management. He is also founder and managing partner of Globis Capital Partners, president of the G1 Institute and the Kibow Foundation, and owner of the Ibaraki Robots basketball team and radio broadcaster Ibaraki Broadcast System.

Early life
Yoshito Hori was born in Mito, Ibaraki Prefecture on March 28, 1962. Hori spent most of his early youth at Tōkai, Ibaraki where his father worked as a nuclear researcher. At age 3 he moved to New York in the United States with his family. About 2 years later his family moved to Michigan. Hori moved back to Japan during the second grade of elementary school. Around the end of sixth grade his family relocated to Mito, Ibaraki Prefecture.

Hori attended  in his hometown of Mito, which he graduated in 1981. After high school he entered Kyoto University where he completed a BSc in Engineering in 1986.

Hori started his career at Sumitomo Corporation in 1986 where he was in charge of new business development and foreign trade of production-plant facilities. He was able to secure sponsorship from his employer in 1989 to study at Harvard Business School. While studying at Harvard Business School, Hori was highly influenced by his classmates in deciding to pursue entrepreneurship. He observed how the US provided a fertile business environment for start-ups. Hori set out to replicate a similar environment in Japan by creating an ecosystem of knowledge, people and capital.
Hori obtained his MBA in 1991. He left Sumitomo in 1992 to start his own business.

Globis Group

Globis Corporation
Hori established Globis Corporation in Japan on August 1, 1992 with 800,000 yen (about $7,500 USD) in capital. He first approached his alma mater about opening a Harvard Business School franchise in Japan but was turned down. A licensing agreement was made, however, allowing Harvard case studies to be used. Hori started teaching a single marketing course based on the case study method from a small rented classroom in Shibuya, Tokyo. Additional business subjects such as finance were subsequently introduced. This started Globis Management School (GMS), the company’s business education department. 

By 1993 Globis Management School had expanded to three campus locations in Tokyo, Osaka and Nagoya. A joint MBA program with the University of Leicester was launched in 1996, later discontinued in January 2008. In 2003 the Graduate Diploma in Business Administration (GDBA) was launched, a non-degree program and predecessor to the later MBA degree offered after the establishment of Graduate School of Management, Globis University. GDBA was discontinued in 2013.

Globis expanded into several new business areas following Globis Management School. In 1993 a corporate training service was launched. In 1995 Globis’s first MBA book series was published. Executive training programs were added in 2005. In 2016 the online learning service GLOBIS Manabihodai was launched. The company introduced a LMS platform in 2018. By 2022, Globis had 691 employees, offices in Tokyo, Osaka, Nagoya, Sendai, Fukuoka, and Yokohama, and overseas subsidiaries in China, Singapore, Thailand, the United States and Belgium.

Globis Capital Partners
In 1996 Hori founded Globis Capital Partners (GCP) as a hands-on VC firm to support various startup portfolio companies. That same year an initial $5 million venture fund was raised, with $1 million coming from Sega Enterprises’ chairman Isao Okawa. In 1999 the Apax Globis Japan Fund worth $187 million was jointly raised with Apax Partners. Five additional funds were raised in 2006, 2013, 2016, 2019 and 2022. Global Capital Partners reported it reached a cumulative fund size of over ¥160 billion JPY (approximately $1.2 billion) invested in over 190 Japanese companies in 2022. Notable portfolio companies that went public include e-commerce platform Mercari, internet media company GREE, and news aggregator app SmartNews. Japan's Government Pension Investment Fund (GPIF) disclosed in 2022 that it would invest in Globis Capital Partners’ latest VC fund, a first in Japan.

Globis University

Since founding Globis, Hori's goal had been to create a graduate school of management, but the financial and legal requirements to establish a university in Japan proved too difficult. This paved the way for Globis to offer higher education degrees accredited by MEXT. Globis established a new entity, the Graduate School of Management, Globis University, which was accredited by MEXT in December 2005 as a for-profit university established by a private company.

A first batch of 78 students enrolled in the Japanese taught two-year part-time MBA in April 2006, offered at campus locations in Tokyo and Osaka. This change would establish an endowment fund supported by retained earnings and donations, which would support the educational environment and campus facilities over the long term. MEXT approved the entity change in April 2008.

As of 2022, the university has a total enrollment of 2,683 students and an annual intake of 1,050 students, making it the largest business school in Japan. Domestic campuses are located in Tokyo, Osaka, Nagoya, Fukuoka, Sendai, Yokohama, and Mito. Four additional overseas locations are maintained in Singapore, Thailand, San Francisco, and Brussels.

National advocacy

G1 Institute
In 2009 Hori founded the G1 Summit as a “forum for the leaders of the next generation to gather, discuss, and paint a vision for the rebirth of Japan in a turbulent world”. The G1 Institute, which Hori serves as president, was subsequently established to support an increasing number of annual conferences and initiatives around Japan.

100 Actions
In 2011 Hori initiated the  project, which aimed to create a future vision for Japan and provide public policy recommendations in the wake of the 2011 Tōhoku earthquake and tsunami. The project culminated in the release of a book in 2016.

Social entrepreneurship

Kibow Foundation
Just days after the destruction of the 2011 Tohoku earthquake and tsunami, Hori launched Project Kibow to help in the efforts to support and rebuild disaster-affected areas. The project grew into what is now the Kibow Foundation. In 2014, Hori was named a Young Presidents’ Organization Global Impact honoree for his efforts. In 2015 the Kibow Impact Investment Fund with a net value of ¥500 million yen was raised to support social entrepreneurship.

Local development
From 2016 Hori has promoted local development efforts in his hometown of Mito in Ibaraki Prefecture. In April 2016, Hori purchased the Ibaraki Robots basketball team. The team was promoted to the Japanese B1 League division in 2021.

In 2019, Hori became the majority owner of Ibaraki Broadcast System. Following the departure announcement of Rock in Japan Festival from Hitachi Seaside Park in Hitachinaka, Ibaraki early 2022, Hori decided to create a new music festival organized by LuckyFM at the vacated location, with himself as self-appointed festival producer. A crowdfunding campaign for the new festival raised over ¥30 million yen on ReadyFor by April 2022. LuckyFM Green Festival or LuckyFes in short was held for the first time on July 23-24, 2022.

Boards and memberships
Hori has served as a board member and advisor for organizations both in Japan and globally.

 Harvard Business School alumni board member (2005-2008)
  sub-committee chair (until 2018)
  board member (2004-2006)
  advisory committee member
  director (2013-2020)
 Woodrow Wilson International Center Global Advisory Council member (from 2015)
 World Economic Forum New Asian Leaders Executive Committee; Global Growth Companies, co-chair; Global Agenda Council on New Models of Leadership
  Young Entrepreneurs’ Organization (YEO) Japan Chapter founder (1995); Asia Pacific Region board member (from 1996)
 YPO Japan Chapter member (from 2005)
 Zionex Japan Director

Publications

Personal life
Hori is married and has 5 sons.

References

External links

 

1962 births
20th-century Japanese businesspeople
21st-century Japanese businesspeople
Globis
Harvard Business School alumni
Japanese businesspeople
Japanese business writers
Japanese chairpersons of corporations
Japanese chief executives
Japanese company founders
Japanese educators
Kyoto University alumni
Living people